Oleg Borisovich Kulik (born 1961 in Kiyv) is a Ukrainian-born Russian performance artist, sculptor, photographer and curator. He is best known for his controversial artistic performances in which he acted like a dog.

Life and art

Kulik was born in Kiyv, graduated from Shevchenko State Art School (1979) and Kiev Geological Survey College (1982).  He lives and works in Moscow from 1986.As a sculptor he began to work under the influence of Alexander Archipenko,  later developed his own style.  Was awarded a scholarship by the Berlin Senate in 1996.

For his performances, Kulik creates a symbolic set of parameters to define the environment which he will inhabit in the persona of a dog, and then devises a series of actions that unfold as a response. The artist describes the dialogue within his practice as "a conscious falling out of the human horizon" which places him on hands and knees. His intention is to describe what he sees as a crisis of contemporary culture, a result of an overly refined cultural language which creates barriers between individuals.  Thus, he simplifies his performance language to half of the basic emotional vocabulary of a domestic animal.

In 2007 "Oleg Kulik: Chronicle 1987–2007, a retrospective of Kulik's work, was exhibited  at the Central House of Artists, Moscow. It was also exhibited at Rencontres d'Arles festival, France in 2004.

As curator of the Regina Gallery, Kulik became known for his unorthodox approaches such as putting paintings on wheels and hiring people to carry the artworks.

Kulik considers his best curatorial endeavor to be "Leopards Bursting into a Temple" by Anatoly Osmolovsky in 1992. In this exhibit, two naked people were put into a cell with live leopards walking around them. He had said that he thought the exhibition was a "metaphor for everything new and lively that appears in our life".

In 2009, Kulik curated the "Kandinsky Prize in London" at the Louise Blouin Foundation.

In 2012  in Kiyv  Kulik curated with Kostyantyn Doroshenko and Anastasia Shavlokhova project "Apocalypse and Renaissance in Chocolate House",  branch of the National Museum  "Kyiv Art Gallery".  At that exhibition 43 artists from Ukraine and Russia presented the metaphor of modern times. Andrey Monastyrsky, Arsen Savadov, Anatoly Osmolovsky, Dmitriy Gutov, Zhanna Kadyrova, Oksana Mas and other artists were among the participants. 

In 2022, Kulik was questioned and faced possible prosecution for "rehabilitation of Nazism" after his 2015 sculptural work 'Big Mother' was shown at Art Moscow. Militant pro-Kremlin politicians claimed that the work mocked The Motherland Calls, a monument to soldiers at Stalingrad. Kulik said "If I could imagine at least 10% of the interpretation that is now being made of my work, I would not only not show it, but I would not even have started it”; it was inspired by “a painful recovery from the trauma associated with splitting up with my beloved wife."

Controversy
At the Interpol group exhibition in Stockholm in 1996, he performed in the gallery chained next to a sign reading "dangerous". An international scandal occurred when he not only attacked members of the public who chose to ignore the sign, in one case biting a man, but also attacked other artworks within the exhibition, partially destroying some pieces made by other artists.   

Kulik thought this was an excusable act, as there was a warning label attached to his performance which people chose to disregard, reasoning that his intention was to divulge his angst at the current cultural crisis through the violent anger of a dog.

The incident inspired a scene in the 2017 film The Square directed by Ruben Östlund, where animal actor Terry Notary plays a performance artist who imitates an ape.

Susan Silas letter
In 1997 artist Susan Silas wrote "A Love Letter to Oleg Kulik, A Prince among Men, a Man among Dogs". She describes visiting Kulik during his performance of "I Bite America and America Bites Me", in which Kulik references Joseph Beuys with an updated reference to the current cultural setting of America. Again, Kulik performed as a dog, this time in a specially built cage, which the spectator would enter wearing protective garb.

References

Sources  
 Olena Kovalchuk. And I could bark to the end: Interview with performer Oleg Kulik. Birdinfligh 1.08. 2018.(in Ukr., Rus.)

External links
 Oleg Kulik on Artnet

1963 births
Living people
Ukrainian sculptors
Ukrainian male sculptors
Shevchenko State Art School alumni
Russian performance artists
Russian contemporary artists